The 1959 Tampa Spartans football team represented the University of Tampa in the 1959 NCAA College Division football season. It was the Spartans' 23rd season. The team was led by head coach Marcelino Huerta, in his eighth year, and played their home games at Phillips Field in Tampa, Florida. They finished with a record of three wins and seven losses (3–7).

Schedule

References

Tampa
Tampa Spartans football seasons
Tampa Spartans football